Scopula juruana is a moth of the family Geometridae. It was described by Arthur Gardiner Butler in 1881. It is found in the Amazon region.

References

Moths described in 1881
juruana
Taxa named by Arthur Gardiner Butler
Moths of South America